Gilles Coudray (born 11 November 1955) is a Congolese swimmer. He competed in the men's 50 metre freestyle event at the 1992 Summer Olympics.

References

1955 births
Living people
Republic of the Congo male freestyle swimmers
Olympic swimmers of the Republic of the Congo
Swimmers at the 1992 Summer Olympics
Place of birth missing (living people)